Pressure-controlled ventilation may refer to:

 Pressure-controlled continuous mandatory ventilation
 Pressure-controlled intermittent mandatory ventilation

See also 

 Mechanical ventilation
 Modes of mechanical ventilation
 Respiratory therapy

Respiratory therapy